Samuel Cook may refer to:

Samuel Cook (artist) (1806–1859), English watercolour painter
Samuel Cook (Chartist) (1786–1861)
Samuel A. Cook (1849–1918), U.S. Representative from Wisconsin
Samuel Albert Cook (1878–1915), medical doctor and member of the American Red Cross mission in Serbia
Sam C. Cook (1855–1924), Mississippi Supreme Court justice
Samuel DuBois Cook (1928–2017), political scientist  and professor
Samuel E. Cook (1860–1946), U.S. Representative from Indiana
Samuel Edward Cook (1787–1856), English writer
Samuel Edward-Cook, English actor
Samuel H. Cook, United States Army officer of the Civil War
J. Samuel Cook (born 1983), African-American playwright, journalist and writer

See also
Sam Cook (disambiguation)
Samuel Cooke (disambiguation)
Cook (surname)